The ISU World Standings and Season's World Ranking are the objective merit-based method used by the International Skating Union (ISU) for single & pair skating and ice dance, as well as synchronized skating.

The ISU Council implemented the former World Standings system for single & pair skating and ice dance for several seasons before 2010. The World Standings system for synchronized skating and the Season's World Ranking were not been implemented until 2010. The current Standings and Ranking system has been in use since the 2010–11 season.

ISU Season's World Ranking

Season's No. 1 skaters 
The remainder of this section are some complete lists, by discipline, of all skaters who are the No. 1 in the season's rankings ordered chronologically, the numbers of season's No. 1 skaters by nation, the times as season's No. 1 by nation, the skaters ordered by the numbers of (consecutive) seasons as season's No. 1, and the youngest/oldest skaters who are the No. 1 in the season's rankings.

Men's singles 

Chronological

*Date the free skating of the World Championships was held.

#Date the 2020 World Championships were officially cancelled.

Records and statistics

The following tables show the numbers of season's No. 1 skaters by nation, and the times as season's No. 1 by nation.

The following table shows the skaters who are the No. 1 in the season's rankings ordered by the numbers of seasons as season's No. 1.

The following table shows the skaters who have been the No. 1 in the season's rankings for at least two consecutive seasons ordered by the numbers of consecutive seasons as season's No. 1.

The following table shows the youngest/oldest skaters who are the No. 1 in the season's rankings.

*Date the free skating of the World Championships was held.

#Date the 2020 World Championships were officially cancelled.

Ladies' singles 

Chronological

*Date the free skating of the World Championships was held.

#Date the 2020 World Championships were officially cancelled.

Records and statistics

The following tables show the numbers of season's No. 1 skaters by nation, and the times as season's No. 1 by nation.

The following table shows the skaters who are the No. 1 in the season's rankings ordered by the numbers of seasons as season's No. 1.

The following table shows the skaters who have been the No. 1 in the season's rankings for at least two consecutive seasons ordered by the numbers of consecutive seasons as season's No. 1.

The following table shows the youngest/oldest skaters who are the No. 1 in the season's rankings.

*Date the free skating of the World Championships was held.

Pairs 

Chronological

*Date the free skating of the World Championships was held.

#Date the 2020 World Championships were officially cancelled.

Records and statistics

The following tables show the numbers of season's No. 1 couples by nation, and the times as season's No. 1 by nation.

The following table shows the couples who are the No. 1 in the season's rankings ordered by the numbers of seasons as season's No. 1.

The following table shows the couples who have been the No. 1 in the season's rankings for at least two consecutive seasons ordered by the numbers of consecutive seasons as season's No. 1.

The following table shows the youngest/oldest skaters who are the No. 1 in the season's rankings.

*Date the free skating of the World Championships was held.

#Date the 2020 World Championships were officially cancelled.

Ice dance 

Chronological

*Date the free dance of the World Championships was held.

#Date the 2020 World Championships were officially cancelled.

Records and statistics

The following tables show the numbers of season's No. 1 couples by nation, and the times as season's No. 1 by nation.

The following table shows the couples who are the No. 1 in the season's rankings ordered by the numbers of seasons as season's No. 1.

The following table shows the couples who have been the No. 1 in the season's rankings for at least two consecutive seasons ordered by the numbers of consecutive seasons as season's No. 1.

The following table shows the youngest/oldest skaters who are the No. 1 in the season's rankings.

*Date the free dance of the World Championships was held.

#Date the 2020 World Championships were officially cancelled.

All disciplines 
Chronological

Records and statistics

The following table shows the numbers of season's No. 1 skaters/couples by nation.

The following table shows the times as season's No. 1 by nation.

The following table shows the skaters/couples who are the No. 1 in the season's rankings ordered by the numbers of seasons as season's No. 1.

The following table shows the skaters/couples who have been the No. 1 in the season's rankings for at least two consecutive seasons ordered by the numbers of consecutive seasons as season's No. 1.

The following table shows the youngest/oldest skaters who are the No. 1 in the season's rankings.

*Date the free skating/free dance of the World Championships was held.

#Date the 2020 World Championships were officially cancelled.

Skaters in the top 3 of the Season's Rankings 
The remainder of this section are some complete lists, by discipline, of all skaters who are in the top 3 of the Season's Rankings ordered chronologically, the numbers of the skaters by nation, the times as season's No. 1, No. 2, and No. 3 by nation, and the skaters ordered by the sums of the numbers of (consecutive) seasons as season's No. 1, No. 2, and No. 3.

Men's singles 
Chronological

Records and statistics

The following table shows the numbers of the skaters who are in the top 3 of the Season's Rankings ordered by nation.

The following table shows the times as season's No. 1, No. 2, and No. 3 by nation.

The following table shows the skaters who are in the top 3 of the Season's Rankings ordered by the sums of the numbers of seasons as season's No. 1, No. 2, and No. 3.

The following table shows the skaters who have been in the top 3 of the Season's Rankings for at least two consecutive seasons ordered by the sums of the numbers of consecutive seasons as season's No. 1, No. 2, and No. 3.

Ladies' singles 
Chronological

Records and statistics

The following table shows the numbers of the skaters who are in the top 3 of the Season's Rankings ordered by nation.

The following table shows the times as season's No. 1, No. 2, and No. 3 by nation.

The following table shows the skaters who are in the top 3 of the Season's Rankings ordered by the sums of the numbers of seasons as season's No. 1, No. 2, and No. 3.

The following table shows the skaters who have been in the top 3 of the Season's Rankings for at least two consecutive seasons ordered by the sums of the numbers of consecutive seasons as season's No. 1, No. 2, and No. 3.

Pairs 
Chronological

Records and statistics

The following table shows the numbers of the couples who are in the top 3 of the Season's Rankings ordered by nation.

The following table shows the times as season's No. 1, No. 2, and No. 3 by nation.

The following table shows the couples who are in the top 3 of the Season's Rankings ordered by the sums of the numbers of seasons as season's No. 1, No. 2, and No. 3.

The following table shows the couples who have been in the top 3 of the Season's Rankings for at least two consecutive seasons ordered by the sums of the numbers of consecutive seasons as season's No. 1, No. 2, and No. 3.

Ice dance 
Chronological

Records and statistics

The following table shows the numbers of the couples who are in the top 3 of the Season's Rankings ordered by nation.

The following table shows the times as season's No. 1, No. 2, and No. 3 by nation.

The following table shows the couples who are in the top 3 of the Season's Rankings ordered by the sums of the numbers of seasons as season's No. 1, No. 2, and No. 3.

The following table shows the couples who have been in the top 3 of the Season's Rankings for at least two consecutive seasons ordered by the sums of the numbers of consecutive seasons as season's No. 1, No. 2, and No. 3.

All disciplines 
Records and statistics

The following table shows the numbers of the skaters/couples who are in the top 3 of the Season's Rankings ordered by nation.

The following table shows the times as season's No. 1, No. 2, and No. 3 by nation.

The following table shows the skaters/couples who have been in the top 3 of the Season's Rankings for at least three seasons ordered by the sums of the numbers of seasons as season's No. 1, No. 2, and No. 3.

The following table shows the skaters/couples who have been in the top 3 of the Season's Rankings for at least three consecutive seasons ordered by the sums of the numbers of consecutive seasons as season's No. 1, No. 2, and No. 3.

Highest season's ranking points 
The remainder of this section are some complete lists, by discipline, of all skaters who have received at least 2400 ranking points in a single season ordered by the points, and the numbers of skaters by nation.

Men's singles 

*Date first received the highest standing points.

†OWG for Olympic Winter Games , WC for World Championships.

Totals by nation

The following table shows the numbers of skaters who have received at least 2400 ranking points in a single season by nation.

Ladies' singles 

*Date first received the highest standing points.

†OWG for Olympic Winter Games , WC for World Championships.

Totals by nation

The following table shows the numbers of skaters who have received at least 2400 ranking points in a single season by nation.

Pairs 

*Date first received the highest standing points.

†OWG for Olympic Winter Games , WC for World Championships.

Totals by nation

The following table shows the numbers of couples who have received at least 2400 ranking points in a single season by nation.

Ice dance 

*Date first received the highest standing points.

†OWG for Olympic Winter Games, WC for World Championships, 4CC for Four Continents Championships.

Totals by nation

The following table shows the numbers of couples who have received at least 2400 ranking points in a single season by nation.

All disciplines 

*Date first received the highest standing points.

†OWG for Olympic Winter Games, WC for World Championships, 4CC for Four Continents Championships.

Totals by nation

The following table shows the numbers of skaters/couples who have received at least 2400 ranking points in a single season, and the numbers of disciplines which the skaters/couples are from by nation.

References 

International Skating Union
Rankings
Skating